Derek Royle (7 September 1928 – 23 January 1990) was a British actor born in London, England. He graduated from RADA in 1950. His face was probably better known than his name to British viewers, but he acted in films and TV from the early 1960s until his death. He had a supporting role in the Beatles' film Magical Mystery Tour in 1967, as well as a minor one with Cilla Black in the film Work Is a Four-Letter Word a year later. 

Most of his film appearances were in comedy films such as  Tiffany Jones (1973), Don't Just Lie There, Say Something! (1974) and Confessions of a Sex Maniac (1974).

Stage and television roles
He appeared in a children's TV comedy series, Hogg's Back (1975) as Doctor Hogg, an eccentric general practitioner (GP); in 2016, this series appeared on Talking Pictures TV. Royle acted with Wendy Richard and Pat Coombs over two series. Hog's Back is a ridge of hills in Surrey. Royle played the hotel guest who dies in his room in the Fawlty Towers episode "The Kipper and the Corpse". 
He also was the first actor to portray Monsieur Ernest Leclerc in the sixth series of 'Allo 'Allo! (replacing Jack Haig, who had portrayed Ernest's brother Roger), and had a supporting role in a remake of Indiscreet (1988) and a new BBC version of a Lord Peter Wimsey story.
As a stage actor he was a mainstay of Brian Rix's Whitehall farces company. He specialised in absent minded characters and used his acrobatic skills to fall down stairs and immediately get up again as if nothing had happened. Theatre critic Michael Coveney called him "simply one of the funniest men on the English stage".

Personal life and death
He was married to make-up artist Jane Royle and their daughters Amanda and Carol Royle became actresses. He died from cancer aged 61.

References

External links
 

1928 births
1990 deaths
Deaths from cancer in England
English male stage actors
English male film actors
English male television actors
Male actors from London
20th-century English male actors
Alumni of RADA
British male comedy actors